Eotebenna is a genus of helcionellid from the Early to Middle Cambrian of Greenland, Denmark and Australia, with sail-like "snorkels", similar to Latouchella.

References

Cambrian molluscs
Fossils of Denmark